Bahar may refer to:

Places

Armenia
 Bahar, the former name of Arpunk, a village in the Gegharkunik Province of Armenia
 Bahar, the former name of Kakhakn, a town in the Gegharkunik Province of Armenia

Northeast Africa 
 Bahir Dar or Bahar Dar, capital city of Amhara Region in Ethiopia
 Northern Red Sea Region, in Eritrea
 Southern Red Sea Region, in Eritrea
 Medri Bahri, a medieval kingdom in the Horn of Africa 
 Red Sea (state), a state in Sudan
 Red Sea Governorate, a governorate in Egypt

Iran
 Bahar, Iran, a city in Hamadan Province of Iran
 Bahar County, an administrative subdivision of Hamadan Province
 Bahar, Khuzestan, a village in Khuzestan Province, Iran
 Bahar, Markazi, a village in Markazi Province, Iran
 Bahar, North Khorasan, a village in North Khorasan Province, Iran
 Bahar, Razavi Khorasan, a village in Razavi Khorasan Province, Iran
 Bahar, Tehran, an area of central Tehran, Iran
 Bahar-e Olya, a village in North Khorasan Province, Iran
 Bahar-e Sofla, a village in North Khorasan Province, Iran
 Central District (Bahar County), a district in Bahar County, Hamadan Province, Iran
 Central District (Chabahar County), a district in Chah Bahar County, Sistan and Baluchestan Province, Iran
 Chah Bahar, a city in and capital of Chah Bahar County, Sistan and Baluchestan Province, Iran
 Chah Bahar County, a county in Sistan and Baluchestan Province, Iran

Malta 
 Baħar iċ-Ċagħaq, a village in Malta

Media
 Bahar (newspaper), a Persian-language newspaper
 Bahar (magazine), a 1910 Persian-language magazine
 Bahar (raga), a Hindustani classical raga
 Bahar, the protagonist of the 2018 film Girls of the Sun

Other uses
 Bahar (name)
 Bahar (unit), an obsolete unit of length in Iran, and unit of mass in Oman
 Bahar Azadi Coin, an Iranian gold coin minted by Central Bank of the Republic of Iran
 Bahir Negus or Bahri Negus, the title of the ruler or king of Medri Bahri, an Eritrean kingdom from 1137 to 1879 
 Red Sea University, a university in Port Sudan, Red Sea State, Sudan
 Zobe-Felezat Bahar Hamedan F.C., an Iranian football club based in Hamedan, Iran
 A variation of Behar, the 32nd weekly Torah portion

See also 
 Baharak (disambiguation)